Vurnovec is a village in Croatia. It is connected by the D29 highway.

Populated places in the City of Zagreb